Cho Sun-Hyung (born July 15, 1988) is a South Korean retired footballer who last played for the Los Angeles Blues in the USL Professional Division.

References

1988 births
Living people
South Korean footballers
South Korean expatriate footballers
Orange County SC players
Expatriate soccer players in the United States
Association football defenders